Air Macau operates services to the following scheduled destinations:

References

Lists of airline destinations